Frederick Charles Gordon Lennox, 9th Duke of Richmond, 9th Duke of Lennox, 9th Duke of Aubigny, 4th Duke of Gordon (5 February 1904 – 2 November 1989) was a British peer, engineer, racing driver, and motor racing promoter.

Biography
Freddie Richmond, as he was known, was the third son of Charles Gordon Lennox, 8th Duke of Richmond and Hilda Brassey. He was educated at Eton College and Christ Church, Oxford. His interest in engineering started while he was at university and afterwards, he was apprenticed to Bentley Motors. He began a motor racing career in 1929 when he took part in the JCC High-Speed Trial. In the next year, he became a member of the Austin team and won the Brooklands 500 Miles. He created his own team of MG Midgets in 1931 and won the Brooklands Double Twelve race, but then became more involved in the organisational side of motorsport.

He inherited the Dukedoms in 1935, along with the Goodwood Estate and the racecourse. Death duties meant he had to sell the family interests in Scotland, including Gordon Castle, and settle on the Goodwood Estate near Chichester. He designed and flew his own aircraft and served with the Royal Air Force during World War II. For a time he was based in Washington, working for the Ministry of Aircraft Production.

After the war, he faced the task of rehabilitating Goodwood, and saw the potential for creating a motor racing circuit from the fighter station built at Goodwood during the Second World War. Horse racing was an important part of the Goodwood scene, but he did not share his ancestors' interest in the sport. The Goodwood Circuit became an important venue in motor racing. However, by 1966 the Duke was concerned at the increasing risks involved in motor racing and closed the circuit except for minor club activities and private testing.

The Duke was the longest-serving Vice President of the Royal Automobile Club, with which he was associated since 1948. As early as the thirties, he was the motoring correspondent of the Sunday Referee, and became the Founder President of the Guild of Motoring Writers.

The Duke appeared on 14 December 1958 episode of the American version of What's My Line?.

A devout Anglican, the Duke represented the Church of England on the World Council of Churches' Central Committee from 1968.

Marriage and children
He married Elizabeth Grace Hudson (1900–1992) on 15 December 1927. She was the daughter of Rev. Thomas William Hudson and his wife, Alethea Mary Matheson, and sister of Bishop Noel Hudson. They were married for sixty-one years and had two children:

Charles Henry Gordon Lennox, 10th Duke of Richmond (19 September 1929 – 1 September 2017)
Lord Nicholas Charles Gordon Lennox KCVO KCMG (31 January 1931 – 11 October 2004), married Mary Williamson and had issue. He was the British Ambassador to Spain from 1984 to 1989

Ancestry

References

Sources
Times Obituary, November 1989

External links

Frederick Charles Gordon-Lennox, 9th Duke of Richmond 
pedigree chart
The Duke on "What's My Line?"

1904 births
1989 deaths
Richmond, Freddie
Brooklands people
Royal Air Force personnel of World War II
204
209
309
Frederick
Dukes of Aubigny
People educated at Eton College
Alumni of Christ Church, Oxford